Fibulariidae is a family of echinoderms belonging to the order Clypeasteroida.

Genera:
 Cyamidia Lambert & Thiery, 1914
 Fibularia Lamarck, 1816
 Fibulariella Mortensen, 1948
 Lenicyamidia Brunnschweiler, 1962
 Tarphypygus
 Thagastea Pomel, 1888

References

Clypeasteroida
Echinoderm families